Vasuki Murugesan was elected to the Tamil Nadu Legislative Assembly from the Karur constituency in the 1996 elections. She was a candidate of the Dravida Munnetra Kazhagam (DMK) party.

References 

Tamil Nadu MLAs 1996–2001
Dravida Munnetra Kazhagam politicians
Year of birth missing
Possibly living people